Dhule Rural Assembly constituency is one of the 288 Vidhan Sabha constituencies of Maharashtra state in western India. This constituency is located in Dhule district

It is part of the Dhule Lok Sabha constituency along with another five Vidhan Sabha segments, namely Dhule City and Sindkheda in Dhule district and Malegaon Central, Malegaon Outer and  Baglan in the Nashik district.

As per orders of Delimitation of Parliamentary and Assembly constituencies Order, 2008, No. 6 Dhule Rural Assembly constituency is composed of the following: Dhule Tehsil (Part), Revenue Circle - Lamkani, Songir, Fagane, Chinchkhede ,Mukati, Dhule, Kusumbe, Arvi and Shirur of Dhule district.

Members of Legislative Assembly
 2009: Sharad Patil, Shiv Sena
 2014: Kunal Rohidas Patil,  Indian National Congress
 2019: Kunal Rohidas Patil,  Indian National Congress
Key

Election results

Assembly Elections 2009

Assembly elections 2014

Assembly elections 2019

See also
 Dhule
 List of constituencies of Maharashtra Vidhan Sabha

References

Assembly constituencies of Maharashtra
Dhule
Dhule district